Nina Serbina (born 21 July 1951) is a Ukrainian former high jumper who competed for the Soviet Union.

Serbina was among the most highly ranked athletes during her career, being the sixth best performer in the world in 1979 then the fourth best of 1980 (third in Europe).

She is married to professional Latvian chess player Zigurds Lanka.

References

External links

Living people
1951 births
Soviet female high jumpers
Ukrainian female high jumpers